Batang Kaharian (Young Kingdom) is a 30-minute religious education program of Sonshine Media Network International.

Segments
BK News
BK Little Quiz

See also
Sonshine Media Network International

Sonshine Media Network International
2000 Philippine television series debuts
Filipino-language television shows